Klokkarstua is a village in Asker municipality in Viken county, Norway. It is located on the southern part of Hurumlandet, the peninsula between the Oslofjord and Drammensfjord.

Highway 289 (Rv289) runs through the village and meanders west down to the Drammensfjord, where the ferry goes on to Svelvik. This is the location for a production plant of Rottefella ski bindings. It also has a sports complex. Klokkarstua was the administrative centre of the former municipality of Hurum until 2012. Hurum Church is located at Klokkarstua. Its population (2005) is about 700.

Hurum Church (Hurum kirke) is a medieval era stone church dating from 1150.  The pulpit was a gift from the wife of naval hero, Ivar Huitfeldt. This is the location of the  Huitfeldt family tomb which dates from 1750.

References

Villages in Viken (county)
Villages in Buskerud
Villages in Asker
Villages in Hurum
Hurum